Rod Laver was the defending champion, but lost in the quarterfinals this year.

Stan Smith won the title, defeating Robert Lutz 7–6(7–2), 7–6(7–5), 4–6, 6–4 in the final.

Seeds

Draw

Finals

Top half

Bottom half

External links
 Main draw

U.S. Pro Indoor
1973 Grand Prix (tennis)